Richard Davies may refer to:

Arts and entertainment
 Richard Davies (Mynyddog) (1833–1877), poet in the Welsh language
 Richard Davies (American actor) (1915–1994), American film actor
 Richard Davies (Australian actor)
 Richard Davies (Welsh actor) (1926–2015), Welsh actor
 Richard Davies (writer) (born 1950), English writer and actor
 Richard Davies (Tru Calling), fictional TV character
 Richard Davies (musician) (born 1964), Australian singer-songwriter
 Richard Michael Davies, better known as Dik Mik, synthesizer player for Hawkwind
 Rick Davies (musician), multi-instrumentalist and member of Amoeba
 Rick Davies (Richard Davies, born 1944), British musician, vocalist for Supertramp
 Ritchie Davies (born 1971), Welsh professional darts player

Sports
 Richard Davies (cricketer) (born 1954), former English cricketer
 Richard Davies (footballer) (born 1990), footballer playing for Barrow AFC
 Rick Davies (footballer) (born 1952), Australian rules footballer
 Dick Davies (1936–2012), American Olympic basketball player

Other
 Richard Davies (bishop) (c. 1505–1581), Welsh bishop and scholar
 Richard Davies (courtier) (1916–1995), member of the Household of the Duke of Edinburgh
 Richard Davies (doctor) (born 1959), British-born Falkland Islands and New Zealand doctor, New Zealand viceregal consort
 Richard Davies (MP) (1818–1896), Member of Parliament for and Lord Lieutenant of Anglesey
 Richard Davies (physician) (died 1761), English physician
 Richard Davies (trade unionist), English trade union leader and politician
 Richard Bell Davies (1886–1966), British First World War fighter pilot
 Richard Gareth Davies (born 1920), British entomologist
 Richard Hutton Davies (1861–1918), New Zealand Army officer
 Paul Davies (priest) (Richard Paul Davies, born 1973), Archdeacon of Bangor
 Richard T. Davies (1920−2005), American diplomat
 Richard William Davies, Welsh Anglican priest

See also
Richard Davis (disambiguation)